Bear Lake National Wildlife Refuge is located in southeast Idaho, seven miles (11 km) south of Montpelier. The refuge office is located in Montpelier.

The  refuge is mainly made up of a bulrush marsh, open water, and flooded meadows of sedges, rushes, and grasses. Portions of the refuge include scattered grasslands and brush-covered slopes.

Bear Lake Refuge encompasses what is locally referred to as Dingle Swamp or Dingle Marsh. Along with Bear Lake proper, the marsh was once part of a larger prehistoric lake that filled the valley.

Fauna 
White-faced ibis, sandhill cranes, swans, ducks, geese, and shorebirds reside in this wildlife refuge during its summer seasons. Moose can sometimes be found on this refuge, along with wintering mule deer. Smaller mammals often seen are muskrats, skunks, and cottontail rabbits.

See also
 National Wildlife Refuge

References
Profile of Bear Lake National Wildlife Refuge
Refuge website

Bear River (Great Salt Lake)
National Wildlife Refuges in Idaho
Protected areas of the Rocky Mountains
Protected areas of Bear Lake County, Idaho
Wetlands of Idaho
Landforms of Bear Lake County, Idaho
1968 establishments in Idaho
Protected areas established in 1968